Djogo (officially as Les couilles de l'éléphant), is a 2002 Gabonese comedy film directed by Henri-Joseph Koumba Bididi and produced by Charles Mensah. The film stars Jean-Claude M'Paka in the lead role whereas Philippe Mory, Malcolm Conrath, Annette Ayeang and Nadège Beausson-Diagne made supportive roles. The film revolves around Alevina, a well-known politician who started his electoral campaign but his daughter has joined up with his opponents.

The film made its premier on 13 February 2002 in France. The film received mixed reviews from critics and screened in many film festivals worldwide. In 2001 at the Panafrican Film and Television Festival of Ouagadougou, the composer of the film, Wasis Diop won the Best Music Award.

Cast
 Jean-Claude M'Paka as Alevina
 Philippe Mory as Kouka
 Malcolm Conrath as Leclerc
 Annette Ayeang as Madame Alevina
 Nadège Beausson-Diagne as Wissi
 Serge Abessolo as Kinga
 Dominique Diata as Georges
 Viviane Biviga as Safou
 Marie-Françoise Mimbie as La sorcière
 Afthanase Ngou as Le porte-serviette

References

External links 
 

Gabonese comedy films
2002 films
2002 comedy films
French comedy films
2000s French films